Judique is an unincorporated place within the Municipality of the County of Inverness on Cape Breton Island, Nova Scotia, Canada. It is the site of the Celtic Music Interpretive Centre and a stop on the scenic Ceilidh Trail.

The origin of the name, pronounced , is uncertain though likely of French origin. It is called Siùdaig in Scottish Gaelic.

Judique presents itself as a collection of buildings with Highway 19 as its main street. It is on the western coast of Cape Breton Island, on the edge of St. George's Bay in the Gulf of Saint Lawrence. 

The area was settled by migrants from the Scottish Highlands in the late 1700s. The nearby Carpenter Gothic styled St. Margaret of Scotland Catholic Church, built in 1841, is a testimony to the Scots' desire to carve out a church-centered community in the wilderness. In 1967, it was the site of the first Gaelic-language mass held in North America.

Judique is also the site of the Judique Historical Society Building a Maritime Vernacular styled house, notable as the last remaining Port Hood company house.

References

General Service Areas in Nova Scotia
Populated places in the Municipality of the County of Inverness, Nova Scotia